John Talbot may refer to:

Nobles
John Talbot, 1st Earl of Shrewsbury (c. 1387–1453), military commander in the Hundred Years' War
John Talbot, 2nd Earl of Shrewsbury (c. 1417–1460), English nobleman and soldier
John Talbot, 3rd Earl of Shrewsbury (1448–1473), English nobleman
John Talbot, 10th Earl of Shrewsbury (1601–1654), English nobleman
John Talbot, 16th Earl of Shrewsbury (1791–1852), British peer and aristocrat
John Talbot, 1st Viscount Lisle (1423–1453), English nobleman and soldier

Politicians
John Talbot (Leics MP), MP for Leicestershire in 1360/1
John Talbot (New Romney MP) (died 1403), MP for New Romney
Sir John Talbot of Lacock (1630–1714), English Member of Parliament for Worcestershire, Knaresborough, Ludgershall and Devizes
John Ivory-Talbot (c. 1691–1772), MP for Ludgershall and Wiltshire
John Talbot (judge) (c. 1712–1756), British MP (for Brecon and Ilchester) and judge (Recorder of Brecon and Puisne Justice of Chester)
John Talbot (Marlborough MP) (c. 1717–1778), British Member of Parliament for Marlborough 1747–1754
John Talbot (died 1818), known as John Crosbie from 1816, MP for Ardfert
J. E. Talbot (John Ellis Talbot, 1906–1967), British Conservative Member of Parliament for Brierley Hill 1959–1967
John Gilbert Talbot (1835–1910), British Conservative Member of Parliament for West Kent 1868–1878 and Oxford University 1878–1910
John Hyacinth Talbot (1794–1868), Irish MP in the British Parliament for New Ross 1832–1841 and 1847–1852
John Talbot (Jacobite), 17th-century Irish landowner, politician and soldier
John C. Talbot (1784–1860), American businessman and politician from Maine

Others
Sir John Talbot of Grafton (1545–1611), English recusant Catholic
John Talbot (martyr) (died 1600), English recusant Catholic and Martyr
John Talbot (Royal Navy officer) (1769–1851), Royal Navy officer
John Talbot (Reformer) (1797–1874), schoolmaster, journalist, and merchant
John G. Talbot (1844–1870), U.S. naval officer
John Michael Talbot (born 1954), American Catholic singer guitarist
John Talbot (died 1549), English Tudor knight and lord of the manor
John W. Talbot, founder of the Order of Owls

Fictional characters
Sir John Talbot, in the film The Wolf Man

See also
John Talbott (disambiguation)
Talbot (surname)